The Australia women's international rules football team was organised by Women's Football Australia and represented Australia in the 2006 Ladies' International Rules Series against Ireland. As of 2019, this is the only series the team has played. Ireland won the series, winning the first test at Breffni Park by 134–15 and the second test at Parnell Park by 39–18.

2006 Series

First test

Second test

2006 squad
The All-Australian team from the 2006 AFL Women's National Championships were all invited to trials for the squad. In addition the top twenty Ladies' Gaelic football players were also invited. The final squad consisted mostly of Victorian Women's Football League players.

Coach Nicole Graves
First test starting XV Joanne Butland (Queensland); Jane Clifton (Victoria), Kerryn Stephens (Victoria), Lauren Tesoriero (Victoria), Shannon McFerran (Victoria), Sarah Hammond (Victoria); Pia Kilburn (Western Australia GAA), Shelley Matcham (Western Australia)  , Belinda Blay (Victoria); Katherine Pender (Queensland), Meg Hutchins (Victoria), Lydia Padgett (Western Australia GAA), Talei Owen (Sydney), Julia Boyle (VWFL/Victoria GAA), Angela Doyle (Western Australia GAA)
Interchange players Kathy Zacharopoulos (Victoria), Anna Haynes (Western Australia)  , Moana Hope (Victoria), Emma Hender (ACT), Renae Campbell (Western Australia GAA), Anna McIlroy (Victoria), Janine Milne (Victoria), Daisy Pearce (Victoria), Michelle Dench (Victoria), Penny Cula-Reid (Victoria)

Notes
  Shelley Matcham was a member of the Australia women's touch football national team
  Anna Haynes was a member of the Australia ultimate national team

References

 
International rules football teams
2006 establishments in Australia